The Ski Federation of Kazakhstan (Qazaqstan Respýblıkasynyń shańǵy jarystary federatsııasy) is the national governing body for skiing in Kazakhstan. The organisation was founded in 1992 among local ski clubs. The Ski Federation of Kazakhstan represents international interests of the Kazakhstani skiing and trains athletes and trainers. The SFK headquarters are located in Nur-Sultan. Current SFK president is Umirzak Shukeyev.

Divisions
 Competitive sport:
 Alpine skiing
 Biathlon
 Cross-country skiing
 Freestyle skiing
 Nordic combined
 Skicross
 Ski jumping
 Telemark skiing

External links
 

 

Kazakhstan
Skiing
Skiing organizations
Skiing in Kazakhstan
Organizations based in Astana